The Hawaii State Open is the Hawaii state open golf tournament, open to both amateur and professional golfers. It is organized by the Aloha section of the PGA of America. It was revived from an earlier event that evolved into the PGA Tour's Sony Open in Hawaii. It has been played annually since 1974 at a variety of courses around the state.

Winners

2017 Tadd Fujikawa
2016 T.J. Kua
2015 Nick Mason
2014 Dean Wilson
2013 Nick Mason
2012 Dean Wilson
2011 Samuel Cyr
2010 Tadd Fujikawa
2009 Jesse Mueller
2008 Nick Mason
2007 Dean Wilson
2006 Tom Eubank
2005 Jarett Hamamoto (amateur)
2004 Chad Saladin
2003 Kris Moe
2002 Tom Eubank
2001 Kevin Hayashi
2000 Kevin Hayashi
1999 Kevin Hayashi
1998 Gregory Meyer
1997 Brian Sasada
1996 Deron Doi
1995 Ken Springer
1994 Scott Simpson
1993 Scott Simpson
1992 Lance Suzuki
1991 Dick McClean
1990 Dick McClean
1989 Chuck Davis
1988 Lance Suzuki
1987 Casey Nakama
1986 Lance Suzuki
1985 David Ishii
1984 David Ishii
1983 Clyde Rego
1982 Wendell Tom (amateur)
1981 Scott Simpson
1980 David Ishii
1979 Scott Simpson
1978 Steve Veriato
1977 Steve Veriato
1976 Lance Suzuki
1975 Allan Yamamoto (amateur)
1974 Dan Nishimoto (amateur)

External links
Aloha Section PGA
History and list of winners 

Golf in Hawaii
PGA of America sectional tournaments
State Open golf tournaments
Recurring sporting events established in 1974
1974 establishments in Hawaii